In mathematics, a property is any characteristic that applies to a given set. Rigorously, a property p defined for all elements of a set X is usually defined as a function p: X →  {true, false}, that is true whenever the property holds; or equivalently, as the subset of X for which p holds; i.e. the set {x | p(x) = true}; p is its indicator function. However, it may be objected that the rigorous definition defines merely the extension of a property, and says nothing about what causes the property to hold for exactly those values.

Examples 

Of objects

 Parity is the property of an integer of whether it is even or odd. 

Of operations

 associative property
 commutative property of binary operations between real and complex numbers 
 distributive property.

See also 
 Unary relation

References

Mathematical terminology
Mathematical relations